Karen Serobi Demirchyan (17 April 1932 – 27 October 1999) was a Soviet and Armenian politician. He served as the First Secretary of the Communist Party of Armenia from 1974 to 1988. Soon after his reemergence into active politics in independent Armenia in the late 1990s, he became President of the National Assembly in 1999 until his assassination with other politicians in parliament in the Armenian parliament shooting.

Biography 

Demirchyan had a difficult childhood. Both his parents died when he was still an infant. He decided on a career in engineering, and took up studies at the Yerevan Polytechnical Institute in 1949. After graduating in 1954 he worked briefly for a research institute in Leningrad before returning to Armenia to join the Yerevan Electrotechnical Factory. A member of the Communist Party since 1954, he soon became secretary of the factory party committee.

His party career flourished and in 1959 Demirchyan was sent to Moscow to the Higher Party School, gaining his diploma in 1961, a prerequisite for higher party service. He returned to work as chief engineer of the Yerevan Electrotechnical Factory and later director. In 1966 he became third secretary of the Yerevan party committee, joining the secretariat of the Armenian Central Committee in 1972.

Demirchyan was elected first secretary of the Armenian Communist Party in November 1974, effectively the leader of Soviet Armenia. Two years later he also became chairman of the Armenian Supreme Soviet. During his fourteen-year rule, Armenia was prosperous by Soviet standards, its economy helped by semi-legal and illegal businesses. However, Demirchyan failed to quell popular demonstrations in Armenia calling for Nagorno-Karabakh to be transferred to Armenian jurisdiction, even siding with the protesters. He lost the support of the Moscow Kremlin leadership and was removed "on health grounds" in May 1988. 

After the collapse of the Soviet Union in 1991 when Armenia regained its independence, Demirchyan became director of the Hayelectromekena electrical equipment plant, the biggest plant in Armenia. He kept out of politics and was a half-forgotten figure from the past, until his surprise reemergence into politics in 1998.

Although not a member of any political party, he contested the March 1998 presidential elections, managing to garner 30 per cent of the votes in the first round and 40 per cent in the second-round run-off against the eventual winner, Robert Kocharyan. He later formed the People's Party, teaming up with defense minister Vazgen Sargsyan to form the Miasnutyun (Unity) alliance to contest the May 1999 parliamentary elections.

The alliance won with 43 per cent of the vote and the majority of parliamentary seats. Demirchyan was overwhelmingly elected President of the National Assembly in June 1999. Four months later, on 27 October, he, Sargsyan and other senior politicians were assassinated in the Armenian parliament shooting.

Karen Demirchyan is buried at Komitas Pantheon which is located in the city center of Yerevan.

Personal life 

Demirchyan was married with two sons, one of whom, Stepan Demirchyan, became a politician in Armenia after its independence in 1991.

Legacy 

A school, metro and a major concert complex are named after Karen Demirchyan in Yerevan. He was buried in a decorative tomb at the Komitas Pantheon, a cemetery in Yerevan where Armenia's most prominent artists and musicians have been buried. He posthumously received the honorary title National Hero of Armenia.

A sort of apple, which was planted in the north-western outskirts of Yerevan under his guidance, was named after Demirchyan.

Notes

See also 
1999 Armenian parliament shooting

1932 births
1999 crimes in Armenia
1999 deaths
1999 murders in Asia
1999 murders in Europe
1990s murders in Armenia
20th-century engineers
Engineers from Yerevan
Politicians from Yerevan
People murdered in Armenia
Candidates for President of Armenia
Central Committee of the Communist Party of the Soviet Union members
First Secretaries of the Armenian Communist Party
National Polytechnic University of Armenia alumni
Party leaders of the Soviet Union
People's Party of Armenia politicians
Presidents of the National Assembly (Armenia)
Tenth convocation members of the Soviet of the Union
Eleventh convocation members of the Soviet of the Union
National Hero of Armenia
Recipients of the Medal "For Distinction in Guarding the State Border of the USSR"
Recipients of the Order of Lenin
Recipients of the Order of the Red Banner of Labour
Armenian engineers
Assassinated Armenian politicians
Soviet engineers
Deaths by firearm in Armenia
Victims of the Armenian parliament shooting
Burials at the Komitas Pantheon